The Delaware County Institute of Science is a science and natural history museum, library and education center in Media, Pennsylvania. It was organized in 1833 and contains exhibits of mounted animals and birds; fossils, shells and corals from around the world; an herbarium; a large collection of minerals; and a reference library and lecture hall for scientific presentations.

History

In the summer of 1833, five friends met at the public house of Isaac Hall in Nether Providence, Pennsylvania and proposed the development of a scientific organization to be named the "Cabinet of Natural Sciences of Delaware County". The five men were George Miller, John Miller, Minshall Painter, George Smith and the noted ornithologist John Cassin. On September 21, 1833, the group met again and created the organization under the name Delaware County Institute of Science.

On January 4, 1837, George Cummings sold a plot of land near the Rose Tree Tavern in Upper Providence, Pennsylvania and a two-story brick building was constructed. The Institute membership continued to increase and incorporated on February 8, 1836. The building was formally opened in September 1837 with a dedicatory address given by Robert Maskell Patterson, the director of the U.S. Mint in Philadelphia. 

Over September 10–12, 1846, the Institute held its first public exhibition of agriculture, manufactures and other products of Delaware County at its hall in Upper Providence. The exhibition continued annually for several years until the Delaware County Agricultural Society was established in 1855 and took over the exhibitions.

In 1867, the current building in Media, Pennsylvania was constructed and the Institute moved to that location. The building was originally intended to house the Media Title and Trust Company on the first floor and the institute on the second floor, but the institute currently occupies the entire building.

Other notable people associated with the Institute include the archeologist Daniel Garrison Brinton and the botanist Graceanna Lewis.

Presidents

Presidents of the Institute include:
 George Smith, M.D. 1833–1882
 Honorable John M. Broomall 1882–1894
 T. Chalkley Palmer 1894–1934
 George Pennock 1934–1938
 Carolus Broomall 1938–1939
 Walter Palmer 1939–1953
 Harold W. Arndt 1953–1960
 Russell J. Emmons 1960–1963
 William Blake Gibson, M.D. 1963–1990
 Alfred C. Palmer 1990–2012
At least six of the institute's past presidents died in office. Walter Palmer was the son of T. Chalkey Palmer.

Exhibits
The Institute contains exhibits of mounted animals and birds; fossils, shells and corals from around the world; an herbarium; a large collection of minerals and a lecture hall for scientific presentations.

Among the holdings is a rare microscope designed by Joseph Zentmayer that was displayed at the 1876 Centennial Exposition in Philadelphia.

Library
The library at the institute is a non-circulating reference collection. It contains several thousand books and publications on the Natural Sciences as well as a large collection of books on local and Pennsylvania history.

See also 
 List of science centers in the United States

References
Citations

Sources

External links

 Delaware County Institute of Science website

1833 establishments in Pennsylvania
Geology museums in the United States
Herbaria in the United States
Mineralogy museums
Museums established in 1833
Museums in Delaware County, Pennsylvania
Natural history museums in Pennsylvania
Science museums in Pennsylvania
Shell museums
Paleontology in Pennsylvania
Zoology organizations